Maximilian Fichtner (born 1961 in Heidelberg, Germany) is professor for Solid State Chemistry at the Ulm University and Executive Director of the Helmholtz Institute Ulm for Electrochemical Energy Storage (HIU).

Education 
Fichtner was educated in Food Chemistry and Chemistry at the University Karlsruhe, now Karlsruhe Institute of Technology where he was awarded by the Diploma in Chemistry. In 1992 he received the Ph.D. in Chemistry/Surface Science with distinction and the Hermann Billing Award for his thesis. In the thesis he developed a novel method for a spatially resolved speciation of beam-sensitive salts by SIMS. With the method he analysed the surface composition of atmospheric salt aerosol particles and contributed to the current climate model.

Career 
Following his PhD, Fichtner spent two years as a Young Researcher at the former Karlsruhe Nuclear Research Center (KfK) and developed his method further so that it could be applied to organic materials also. In 1994 he became assistant to the board of directors of the Karlsruhe Research Center (FZK), in the area Basic Research and New Technologies, with Herbert Gleiter as director. In 1997 he left to built up a new activity on Microprocess Engineering, with a focus on heterogeneous catalysis in microchanels, for fuel processing (methanol steam reforming, partial oxidation of methane) and synthesis of chemicals. The group was eventually integrated in the new Institute for Microprocess Engineering in 2001. In 2000 he was offered a position at the new Institute of Nanotechnology, INT (Founding directors: Herbert Gleiter, Jean-Marie-Lehn, Dieter Fenske) to build up a new activity on Nanoscale Materials for Energy Storage. Since then he is group leader there. In 2012 he received a call by the Ulm University to become a professor (W3) in Solid State Chemistry, which he accepted in 2013. The position is connected to a function as group leader at the new Helmholtz Institute Ulm. Since 2015 he has been executive director of the institute.

Fichtner has co-ordinated several EU projects and collaborative projects from the German ministries of Economy and Research and Education. He has been organizer of various symposia at MRS and GRC conferences, and he was Chair of the GORDON Research Conference on Metal-Hydrogen Systems in 2013 and of the 1st International Symposium on Magnesium Batteries (MagBatt) in 2016.

Research 
In his career Fichtner worked on various topics, covering Theoretical Chemistry, Instrumental Analysis, Higher Administration, Chemical Engineering, Heterogeneous Catalysis, Hydrogen Storage, Electrochemistry and Battery Research.

Pioneering achievements were the first measurements of salts with Secondary Neutral Mass Spectrometry, the development of a depth-resolved speciation of beam sensitive salts, a microstructure reactor which could safely burn and transfer the heat from a stoichiometric hydrogen-oxygen mixture to a thermo oil, thus demonstrating the enormous capability of running dangerous reactions in microstructure reactors safely.

In the development of hydrogen storage materials, new complex hydride compounds were synthesized and investigated, the fasted charge and discharge of an aluminum hydride to date by a new Ti13 catalyst, first applied for that purpose by the Bogdanovig group of Max Planck Mülheim, was independently confirmed. Further work in this area was focused on elucidating nanoscale effects in energy materials and studies, based on pioneering work since the late 1990s by various groups from all over the world on hydrogen and the effects by nanostructures, of the change of thermodynamic properties of complex hydrides was conducted in his group.

In battery research, new synthesis methods were developed to stabilize conversion materials, new types of batteries based on anionic shuttles were presented and new electrolytes were developed for magnesium properties with outstanding voltage windows and non-nucleophilic properties, making reversible Mg-S cells possible. Moreover, a new class of cathode materials is being studied with the highest packing densities for Li ions to date, the so-called Li Rich FCC Materials, developed by the Ceder group.

References

External links
 

1961 births
Living people
Scientists from Heidelberg
20th-century German chemists
Academic staff of the University of Ulm
21st-century German chemists
Solid state chemists
Karlsruhe Institute of Technology alumni